Pseudobissetia terrestrellus is a species of moth in the family Crambidae. It is found in Spain, Italy, Romania, Bulgaria, Tunisia, Jordan, Syria, Iran, Transcaspia, Turkmenia, Buchara and Turkmenistan.

The wingspan is about 23 mm.

The larvae feed on Zea mays.

References

Moths described in 1885
Haimbachiini
Moths of Japan
Moths of Europe